Talitha Cummins is an Australian journalist.

Cummins has previously been a news presenter on Weekend Sunrise, reporter for Seven News and weather presenter on Seven News Brisbane.

Career

Cummins has worked in many of Seven's Queensland’s bureaus, she started out at Maroochydore before moving onto Cairns. She joined the Seven Brisbane team in 2004 as a reporter.

In 2005, she was promoted to weeknight weather presenter for Seven News in Brisbane. However, after the bulletin continued to lag behind Nine News Queensland and Ten News Brisbane in the ratings, Cummins was relegated to weekend duties, replaced on weeknights by former Nine weatherman John Schluter from February 2007. She occasionally filled-in for the local Brisbane bulletin when either Kay McGrath or Sharyn Ghidella were on holiday or ill.

In June 2007, Cummins joined Weekend Sunrise as a news presenter on Sunday mornings. She held the position until July 2008 where she was replaced by Sharyn Ghidella.

In 2011, Cummins moved to Sydney, where she is a reporter for Seven News Sydney and a fill in presenter on Seven Morning News and Seven Afternoon News.

In January 2014, Cummins was appointed news presenter on Weekend Sunrise replacing Jessica Rowe. Cummins remained in the role until she went on maternity leave in September 2016.

In January 2017, it was revealed that the Seven Network had dismissed Cummins whilst she was on maternity leave.

Cummins is also a casual Triple M Sydney newsreader.

Personal life
Cummins was born on the Gold Coast.

Cummins was engaged to former Olympic beach volleyball player Lee Zahner however they separated in 2010.

In May 2013, Cummins announced that she is engaged to personal trainer Ben Lucas and in October 2013, they married in New York.

It was revealed on the ABC's Australian Story (10 October 2016) that she has battled alcoholism.

In January 2016, Cummins announced she is pregnant with her first child. She gave birth to son later that year. In June 2018, Cummins announced that she was pregnant with her second child.

References

External links
 Profile on www.seven.com

Australian television journalists
Australian television presenters
Australian women journalists
Australian women television presenters
Year of birth missing (living people)
Living people
People from the Gold Coast, Queensland